The Desolation Wilderness is a  federally protected wilderness area in the Eldorado National Forest and Lake Tahoe Basin Management Unit, in El Dorado County, California. The crest of the Sierra Nevada runs through it, just west of Lake Tahoe.

History 
Before European settlement in the mid-19th century, there is evidence this area was used by the Washoe. After, it was known at times as "Devil's Valley," and most often used for cattle grazing. By the end of that century, the first formal step to limiting its development when it was made a Forest Reserve, managed first by the General Land Office, and later, by the US Forest Service. In 1969, it became the Desolation Wilderness after the passage of the Wilderness Act of 1964.

Access 

Desolation is a popular backpacking destination, with much barren rocky terrain at the edge of the tree line. It has extensive areas of bare granite rock formations.

The Tahoe Rim Trail and Pacific Crest Trail pass through the wilderness. A list of other trailheads that provide access to the wilderness follows.

 Loon Lake trailhead
 Buck Island trailhead
 Van Vleck trailhead
 Rockbound trailhead
 Twin Lakes trailhead
 Lyons trailhead
 Twin Bridges trailhead
 Ralston trailhead
 Echo trailhead
 Echo Lakes trailhead
 Glen Alpine trailhead
 Mount Tallac trailhead
 Bayview trailhead
 Eagle Falls trailhead
 Meeks Bay trailhead
 Horsetail Falls trailhead

Permits are required for both day use and overnight camping. In the summer, a quota system is used for overnight trips to limit the number of visitors on any given day in the wilderness. Desolation Wilderness is one of the most heavily used protected areas in the United States. This Wilderness area is split up into 45 different zones, with each having a specific permitting quota. Permits are available only online via recreation.gov; paper permits are not being issued in 2020 because of the COVID-19 pandemic.

Ecology 

The Desolation Wilderness provides a home for many species of plants, fish and wildlife.

Desolation Wilderness supports predominantly red fir and lodgepole pine forests with associated species such as Jeffrey pine, mountain hemlock, ponderosa pine, western juniper, and western white pine. These hardy trees take root in excessively rocky and often nutrient-poor soils. As much of the ground surface in Desolation is bedrock granite: soils are limited. Decomposed granite accumulations are often shallow deposits within glacially scoured basins. The most extensive forested areas are found on moist soils bordering lakes, streams, and meadows. The limited tree cover in Desolation is valuable for watershed protection, wildlife habitat, and aesthetics.

The sparse woodlands of widely scattered western junipers and lodgepole pines are interrupted by patches of montane chaparral species such as pinemat manzanita, huckleberry oak, and mountain pride penstemon clinging to the expanses of barren rock. There are many wet meadows throughout the wilderness, each unique due to the differences in elevation, exposure, soil composition and soil depth, resulting in a wide diversity of annual and perennial plant life. A variety of wildflower species, sedges, and grasses inhabit these fragile wet areas. Aspen and willow are common to these wetland areas.

Mule deer are the largest of the game species found within the wilderness. Black bears are increasingly common, with individuals being displaced from the Tahoe Basin and lower elevation western slopes into the higher country. More common, yet seldom seen, are the smaller mammals like coyote, porcupine, badger, and bobcat. Species of special interest that are very rare in the area are the fisher, pine marten, red fox, and wolverine.

Desolation also provides an ideal habitat for numerous alpine rodents such as the yellow-bellied marmot, golden-mantled ground squirrel and Douglas squirrel.  Also found is a member of the rabbit and hare family, the pika. There are also a variety of mountain birds, including the Steller's jay, Clark's nutcracker, mountain chickadee, sooty grouse, mountain bluebird, American dipper, and occasional golden eagle.

Within Desolation's numerous lakes and streams are also a variety of game fish such as the rainbow and brook trout. Less common, but also present are brown and golden trout.

Geography 

Among the many waterfalls within the wilderness is Horsetail Falls.

Its largest body of water is Lake Aloha, a reservoir with shallow, clear waters sitting in a wide granite basin carved by glaciers of the last ice age. Many other alpine and wooded lakes of various sizes are scattered throughout the area.

Footnotes

External links 
 
 
 
 
 

Wilderness areas of California
Eldorado National Forest
 
 
Protected areas of the Sierra Nevada (United States)
Protected areas of El Dorado County, California
History of El Dorado County, California